Norrie (also known as the Norrie Colony) is a census-designated place (CDP) located in and governed by Pitkin County, Colorado, United States. The population of the Norrie CDP was 7 at the United States Census 2010. The Meredith post office  serves the area. The CDP is a part of the Glenwood Springs, CO Micropolitan Statistical Area.

History
Norrie was originally settled in the late 1880s. It began as a camp for railroad workers building the Colorado Midland Railway route along the Fryingpan River. The workers harvested trees used in the railroad construction, and they made ice in the local ponds, ice used in the railroad's refrigerator cars. Now, many privately-owned summer cabins line the community's quiet streets.

Geography

Demographics

See also

 List of census-designated places in Colorado
 List of ghost towns in Colorado

References

External links

 Norrie @ GhostTowns.com
 Norrie, Colorado Mining Claims And Mines

Census-designated places in Pitkin County, Colorado
Census-designated places in Colorado